Calcutta Institute of Technology (commonly CIT) & Calcutta Institute of Pharmaceutical Technology & Allied Health Sciences (commonly CIPT) is a co-educational private school & pharmacy, b.ed & engineering college with Primary to higher secondary English medium school Bharat Academy & Sciences(commonly BAS) & Uluberia Rural Society for Care of Health and Research Development (Commonly URSCHARD) located in Uluberia, West Bengal, India offers English medium school affiliated 
to Council for the Indian School Certificate Examinations (CISCE)
diploma & degree engineering all courses which are affiliated to All India Council for Technical Education(AICTE),Maulana Abul Kalam Azad University of Technology(MAKAUT), West Bengal State Council of Technical Education (WBSCTE).

This group is officially affiliated: Calcutta Institute of Technology (URSCHARD).
Uluberia Rural Society for Care of Health and Research Development
Uluberia Calcutta Institute Of Technology
Calcutta Institute of Pharmaceutical Technology & Allied Health Sciences
Bharat Academy & Sciences

See also
List of institutions of higher education in West Bengal
Education in India
Education in West Bengal
Calcutta Institute of Engineering and Management

External links 
http://bciedu.org/colleges/cit.php
https://web.archive.org/web/20090619091259/http://www.wbut.net/

Universities and colleges in Howrah district
Colleges affiliated to West Bengal University of Technology
2004 establishments in West Bengal
Educational institutions established in 2004